John Percival Bromfield (1883-1947), was a male English international table tennis player.

Table tennis career
He won a bronze medal at the 1926 World Table Tennis Championships in the men's  team event.

He was the English Champion in 1903-04 and again in 1923-24 and invented the flick-stroke, the foundation of the modern attacking  He also won two English Open titles.

Bromfield ran the table tennis club in which Charlie Bull learnt to play.

See also
 List of England players at the World Team Table Tennis Championships
 List of World Table Tennis Championships medalists

References

1880s births
1947 deaths
World Table Tennis Championships medalists
English male table tennis players